Gat Rimon (lit. Pomegranate press) is a moshav in central Israel. Located in the Ono Valley in the Sharon plain between Ganei Tikva and Petah Tikva, it falls under the jurisdiction of Drom HaSharon Regional Council.

History
The moshav was founded in 1926 by workers from Petah Tikva who were children of middle class immigrants of the Fourth Aliyah. It was initially called HaTehiya (lit. The Biblical town is "identified with Tel Gerisa" near the Yarkon river in the north of Tel Aviv by the archaeologist Benjamin Mazar. According to the 1931 census Gat Rimon had a population of 142 Jews, in 30 houses.

References

Moshavim
Populated places established in 1926
Populated places in Central District (Israel)
1926 establishments in Mandatory Palestine